Euastacus hystricosus is a species of southern crawfish in the family Parastacidae.

The IUCN conservation status of Euastacus hystricosus is "EN", endangered. The species faces a high risk of extinction in the near future. The IUCN status was reviewed in 2010.

References

Further reading

 
 

Euastacus
Articles created by Qbugbot
Crustaceans described in 1951